The Minister for Transport is a minister in the Government of New South Wales who has responsibilities which include transport policy and regulation, to setting of fares and concessions for rail, ferry, bus and light rail transport, and the administration of maritime facilities in New South Wales, Australia. 

The current Minister for Transport is David Elliott. He is assisted in the management of the portfolio by:
 Minister for Metropolitan Roads, currently Natalie Ward, who has responsibility of the development of road infrastructure and road pricing, and taxi and hire car policy and regulation in the metropolitan parts of the state.
 Minister for Regional Transport and Roads, currently Sam Farraway, who has responsibilities of the development of road infrastructure and road pricing, and taxi and hire car policy and regulation in the regional parts of the state.
 Minister for Infrastructure, Minister for Cities and Minister for Active Transport, currently Rob Stokes, who is responsible for active transport (cycling and pedestrian movement) including cycleways and footpaths.

All ministers were sworn in on 21 December 2021. Together they administer the portfolio through the Department of Transport (Transport for NSW) and a range of other government agencies that coordinate funding arrangements for transport operators, including hundreds of local and community transport operators.

List of ministers

Transport
The portfolio of Minister for Transport was created under Ministry of Transport Act No. 3, 1932. The following individuals have been appointed as Ministers for Transport, or similar titles.

Former ministerial titles

Railways

Assistant ministers
The following individuals have been appointed as Assistant Ministers with responsibility for assisting or advising the Minister for Transport.

See also 

List of New South Wales government agencies

Notes

References

External links 
Transport New South Wales

Transport